Tenth Avenue Angel is a 1948 American film directed by Roy Rowland and starring Margaret O'Brien, Angela Lansbury, and George Murphy. It chronicles the life and family of Flavia Mills (Margaret O'Brien) in the late 1930s. Filming took place 11 March–15 May 1946, with retakes in April 1947. However, the film was not released until February 20, 1948.

Plot
Eight-year-old Flavia (Margaret O'Brien) lives in a New York tenement during the Great Depression with mother Helen (Phyllis Thaxter) and father Joe (Warner Anderson), who's nearly broke and needs a job. Her aunt Susan (Angela Lansbury) lives with them, too. Flavia's thrilled because her aunt's sweetheart, Steve (George Murphy), is returning from a one-year absence. The little girl is unaware that Steve has been in jail for associating with a gangster.

Flavia sees a mouse and is afraid. Her mother tells Flavia a fable that if you catch a mouse and make a wish, it will turn into money. This leads her to hide a mouse in a cigar box in the alley near Mac (the blind newspaper man)'s stand. Two neighborhood youths rob Mac
(Rhys Williams) and, by coincidence, hide the money right by the girl's box with the mouse. Flavia finds it and is overjoyed until the adults accuse her of stealing it from Blind Mac. Her mother has to tell her the truth about the fable and Flavia realizes that so many stories she has heard are "lies".

Everybody's desperate for money. Helen's pregnant and faces physical complications. Steve's unable to get his old job, driving a taxi. The gangster offers him a payday for stealing a truck, but Steve's conscience gets the better of him at the last minute. Flavia tries to find the kneeling cow near a railroad before it's too late.  Helen is all right, Joe finds a job, and Flavia's thrilled because Susan's going to marry Steve.

Cast
 Margaret O'Brien as Flavia Mills
 Angela Lansbury as Susan Bratten
 George Murphy as Steve Abbott
 Phyllis Thaxter as Helen Mills
 Warner Anderson as Joseph Mills
 Rhys Williams as Blind Mac
 Barry Nelson as Al Parker
 Connie Gilchrist as Mrs. Murphy
 Charles Cane as Parole Officer
 Richard Lane as Street Vendor

Reception
The film was an expensive failure at the box office, earning only $725,000 in the US and Canada and $75,000 elsewhere, resulting in a loss of $1,227,000.

It has received mixed to negative reviews.

References

External links
 
 
 
 
 Tenth Avenue Angel at Rotten Tomatoes

1948 films
1940s Christmas drama films
1948 drama films
American Christmas drama films
American mystery drama films
American black-and-white films
Films directed by Roy Rowland
Great Depression films
Metro-Goldwyn-Mayer films
Films set in New York City
Films based on works by Craig Rice
American drama films
1940s mystery drama films
1940s American films